Crescentius of Rome is venerated as a child martyr by the Roman Catholic Church.  According to tradition, he was born of a noble Roman family and was baptized along with his parents by Epigmenius. During the persecutions of Christians by Diocletian, the family fled to Perugia, where his father Euthymius died. Led back to Rome, Crescentius, who was eleven years old, was beheaded on the via Salaria, outside of the city walls.

Veneration
He was buried in the cemetery of Priscilla on the Via Salaria.  His place of burial became a focus of pilgrimage and veneration in the Middle Ages.  His body was translated from Rome to Siena around 1058 at the request of Bishop Antifredus.  Other relics were translated to Tortosa in 1606. 
     
The only biographical source concerning Crescentius was derived from the copy of a manuscript from 1600 and conserved in the Biblioteca Vallicelliana.   The Acta is not reliable as it was written long after the alleged death of this saint.   Dante Balboni believes it was composed at Tuscany around 1058, when the body of Crescentius was translated to Siena.   During the Middle Ages, Crescentius was the subject of a popular cult in Siena. 

He is depicted in the Maestà of Duccio.

References

External links
St. Crescentius
 San Crescenzio di Roma
Colonnade Statue in St Peter's Square

292 births
303 deaths
4th-century Christian martyrs
4th-century Romans
Christian child saints
Christian martyrs executed by decapitation
Italian children
Executed Italian people